In Greek mythology, Aetolus (Ancient Greek: Αἰτωλός Aitolos) was the name of the following figures:
Aetolus, eponym of Aetolia and king of Elis.
 Aetolus, father of Palaemon, who was counted among the Argonauts. The latter was also called the son of Hephaestus or Lernus of Olenus.
 Aetolus, son of Oxylus, the man who helped the Heracleidae, and of Pieria and brother Laias. Aetolus died before his parents, and they buried him in a tomb in the gate leading to Olympia because an oracle forbade the corpse to be laid either outside the city or within it. The gymnasiarch of Elis used to offer an annual sacrifice on his tomb as late as the time of Pausanias.

Notes

References 

 Apollodorus, The Library with an English Translation by Sir James George Frazer, F.B.A., F.R.S. in 2 Volumes, Cambridge, MA, Harvard University Press; London, William Heinemann Ltd. 1921. ISBN 0-674-99135-4. Online version at the Perseus Digital Library. Greek text available from the same website.
Apollonius Rhodius, Argonautica translated by Robert Cooper Seaton (1853-1915), R. C. Loeb Classical Library Volume 001. London, William Heinemann Ltd, 1912. Online version at the Topos Text Project.
Apollonius Rhodius, Argonautica. George W. Mooney. London. Longmans, Green. 1912. Greek text available at the Perseus Digital Library.
Gaius Julius Hyginus, Fabulae from The Myths of Hyginus translated and edited by Mary Grant. University of Kansas Publications in Humanistic Studies. Online version at the Topos Text Project.
Pausanias, Description of Greece with an English Translation by W.H.S. Jones, Litt.D., and H.A. Ormerod, M.A., in 4 Volumes. Cambridge, MA, Harvard University Press; London, William Heinemann Ltd. 1918. Online version at the Perseus Digital Library
 Pausanias, Graeciae Descriptio. 3 vols. Leipzig, Teubner. 1903.  Greek text available at the Perseus Digital Library.
 Strabo, The Geography of Strabo. Edition by H.L. Jones. Cambridge, Mass.: Harvard University Press; London: William Heinemann, Ltd. 1924. Online version at the Perseus Digital Library.
 Strabo, Geographica edited by A. Meineke. Leipzig: Teubner. 1877. Greek text available at the Perseus Digital Library.

Aetolian characters in Greek mythology
Thessalian mythology